A by-election for the French National Assembly was held in Senegal in 1879. Although Maréchal received over 50% of the vote in the first round, he did not reach the quorum of 25% of registered voters. Alfred Gasconi, the Republican candidate, was elected in the second round of voting.

Background
The single Senegalese seat in the National Assembly had been abolished by a decree of 2 February 1852. Although it was restored in 1871, a new electoral law was passed in 1875 that did not mention Senegal, meaning no MP was elected in 1876 or 1877. However, a decree of 1879 reinstated the seat.

Electoral system
The election was held using the two-round system, with a candidate required to get over 50% of the vote and a number of votes equivalent to 25% of the registered voters to win in the first round.

Results

See also
Four Communes

References

Senegal
1879 in Senegal
Elections in Senegal
By-elections to the National Assembly (France)